Kenneth Hubert "Ken" Fogarty,  (1923 – 14 January 1989) was Mayor of Ottawa, Ontario, Canada, from 1970 to 1972 and afterwards an Ontario district court judge until his death.

Fogarty was born in Ottawa, where he earned Bachelor of Arts and Master of Arts degrees at the University of Ottawa. He became a lawyer in 1950 after graduating from Osgoode Hall Law School in 1948. He returned to the University of Ottawa to study for his Master of Laws degree in French which he attained in 1969.

He ran for the Ontario Liberal Party in the riding of Ottawa South in the 1951 and 1955 provincial elections, losing both times. He represented Queensboro Ward on Ottawa City Council from 1961 to 1965. He then served on the Ottawa Board of Control from 1965 to 1970.

He died aged 65 in an Ottawa hospital due to cardiac failure.

References

1923 births
1989 deaths
Judges in Ontario
Lawyers in Ontario
Canadian King's Counsel
Mayors of Ottawa
University of Ottawa alumni
Ottawa controllers
20th-century Canadian lawyers